Strandlykkja Church is a parish church of the Church of Norway in Stange Municipality in Innlandet county, Norway. It is located in the village of Strandlykkja. It is one of the churches for the Tangen parish which is part of the Hamar domprosti (deanery) in the Diocese of Hamar. The brown, wooden church was built in a long church design in 1915 using plans drawn up by the architect Haldor Børve. The church seats about 90 people.

History
By the early 20th century, plans were made to build a chapel in Strandlykkja in the far southern part of the municipality. The building was designed by Haldor Børve and is located on a plot of land that was donated by Berte Marie Strandløkken, the owner of the Strandløkken farm. The church is a stave church-inspired long church with seating for about 90 people. The new chapel was consecrated on 12 August 1915. The chapel was originally designated as an annex chapel under the nearby Tangen Church and it was titled Strandlykkja Chapel. In 2015, the chapel was upgraded to parish church status and re-titled as Strandlykkja Church.

Media gallery

See also
List of churches in Hamar

References

Stange
Churches in Innlandet
Long churches in Norway
Wooden churches in Norway
20th-century Church of Norway church buildings
Churches completed in 1915
1915 establishments in Norway